Dumpa Mary Vijayakumari (born 9 July 1952) is an Indian politician and a Member of Parliament elected from the Bhadrachalam-ST constituency in the Indian state of Andhra Pradesh being a Telugu Desam Party candidate.

Early life and education
Vijayakumari was on born on 9 July 1952 in Sarugudu village in Visakhapatnam district in the Indian state of Andhra Pradesh. She is a graduate of Andhra University, Visakhapatnam in Master of Arts. She married Shri Maridaiah on 3 Jan 1975. She has three sons and one daughter.

Career
In 1999, Vijayakumari was elected a Member of Parliament to 13th Lok Sabha. She served as a member of Committee on Communications from 1999 to 2001, Committee on Empowerment of Women from 2001 to 2002 and 2002–2004, as a member of Consultative Committee, Ministry of Environment and Forests. She has been involved in the upliftment of Scheduled Castes, Scheduled Tribes, Backward Classes, Women, Orphans and aged people.

References

Articles created or expanded during Women's History Month (India) - 2014
1952 births
Living people
Telugu Desam Party politicians
India MPs 1999–2004
People from Visakhapatnam district
Lok Sabha members from Andhra Pradesh
Telugu politicians